Lentilitoribacter donghaensis is a Gram-negative, aerobic, non-spore-forming bacteria from the genus of Lentilitoribacter which was isolated from coastal seawater from the Sea of Japan in South Korea.

References

External links
Type strain of Lentilitoribacter donghaensis at BacDive -  the Bacterial Diversity Metadatabase

Rhizobiaceae
Bacteria described in 2013